Gary Sherman may refer to:

Gary Sherman (director) (born 1945), film director
Gary Sherman (politician) (born 1949), jurist and legislator in Wisconsin
Garry Sherman (born 1933), musician, arranger and podiatrist